Bone Brothers III (or Bone Brothers 3) is the third album by Layzie Bone and Bizzy Bone. It is the third of the Bone Brothers albums, the first one being released in 2005 entitled Bone Brothers and the second being released in 2007 entitled Bone Brothers 2.  The album was released in early 2008 under the little-known Siccness.net on the February 5, 2008.

Featured guests 
Bone Brothers III featured a number of special guests for the album including Notorious B.I.G., Petey Pablo, Mo thug member Thin C, Cuttthroat Raw and most noticeably Krayzie Bone and Wish Bone from the group Bone Thugs-N-Harmony in the song The Struggle (in which Petey Pablo also appeared. This is the second time since Bone Thugs-n-Harmony and Bizzy Bone split that they have sung together (the other being in 2005 in the Bone Brothers album).
The song The Struggle is believed to have been a cut song from Bone Thugs-N-Harmony album Strength and Loyalty which featured Bizzy Bone. 
Bone Thugs-N-Harmony have now re-recruited both Bizzy Bone and Flesh-N-Bone (who was released from prison in 2008) after Bizzy Bone met Krayzie Bone after a concert in California.

Track listing

Track notes 
The song "Rollercoaster" was the only single from the album Bone Brothers III and peaked at number 57 on the U.S Rap Chart. The song was also released on Bizzy Bone's album Ruthless.
The song "Lockdown Love" is a Flesh-N-Bone dedication.
The song "The Struggle" was originally on the Strength and Loyalty album before being cut.

2008 albums
Bone Brothers albums
Real Talk Entertainment albums
Albums produced by Big Hollis